Yumio Sakurai (1945-2012) was a Japanese historian who specialized in Japanese history and history of Southeast Asia.

Publications

Author 
''The Formation of Vietnamese villages.: Village Shared Fields = Historical Development of Condien System" =ベトナム村落の形成――村落共有田＝コンディエン制の史的展開 ‘’Betonamu sonraku no keisei’’) (Sōbunsha, 1987)
"The Melancholy of Hanoi" ( Mekon 1989)
 ("Green Field: Walking the History of Southeast Asia" =『緑色の野帖――東南アジアの歴史を歩く』 (Mekon 1997)
 "People living in rice: the baldness of the sun, the kindness of forests and water"  = 『米に生きる人々――太陽のはげまし、森と水のやさしさ』   Shueisha 2000)
 "History of Southeast Asia" (The Open University of Japan 2002)
 "Pre-modern Southeast Asia" (The Open University of Japan 2006)

Coauthor or co-editor 

 (with  Yoshiaki Ishizawa ) "Modern History of Southeast Asia (3) Vietnam, Cambodia, Laos" . (東南アジア現代史（3）ヴェトナム・カンボジア・ラオス; editor: Yoshiaki Ishizawa) (Yamakawa Publishing Co., Ltd., 1977) ( Yamakawa Shuppansha , 1977)
 ( Yoneo Ishii ) "Visual Version" World History (12) Formation of the Southeast Asian World "( Kodansha , 1985)
 (Yoshiaki Ishizawa, Noboru Kiriyama ) "World History from the Region (4) Southeast Asia" ( Asahi Shimbun , 1993)

Editor 

 "Vietnam I Want to Know More" ( Koubundou Publishers, 1989 / 2nd Edition, 1995)
 "Iwanami Lecture: History of Southeast Asia (4) Development of Early Modern Southeast Asian Countries" ( Iwanami Shoten , 2001)

Co-editor 

 ( Tadayo Watabe ) "Rice Culture in Gangnam, China: Its Interdisciplinary Study" ( Japan Broadcast Publishing Association , 1984)
 (Yoneo Ishii) "History of Southeast Asia (1) Continental Region" (Yamakawa Shuppansha, 1999)
 ( Shiro Momoki ) "Vietnamese Encyclopedia" ( Dohosha , 1999)

Translation Editor 

 George Sedes, History of Indochina Civilization ( Misuzu Shobo , 1969)

Footnotes

External links

"The Yumio SAKURAI Collection"

1945 births
2012 deaths
20th-century Japanese historians
21st-century Japanese historians
Academic staff of the University of Tokyo